L'Aura is the second album by Italian singer L'Aura, released on 8 June 2007 by Sony. This album contains lyrics in Italian, English and French.

Track listing
 Le vent (Laura Abela)
 One (Laura Abela)
 È per te feat. Max Zanotti (Laura Abela/Max Zanotti/Adriano Pennino)
 Beware! The Modern Eye! (Laura Abela)
 I'm So Fucked Up I Can Barely Walk (Laura Abela)
 The River (Laura Abela)
 I Just Want to Grow Old (Laura Abela)
 Non è una favola (Laura Abela)
 I'm With You (Laura Abela/Adriano Pennino)
 Demian (Laura Abela)
 Hey Hey (Laura Abela)
 The Doors (Laura Abela)
 Turn Around feat. Georganne Kalweit (Laura Abela/Adriano Pennino)

Chart

Personnel
L'Aura - Lead vocals, piano, keys
Enrique Gonzalez Müller - Producer, Engineer, Mixer, Sampling
Davide Pezzin - Electric and upright Bass
Davide De Vito - drums, percussion
Alberto De Rossi - Acoustic and electric guitar
Davide Arneodo - keyboards, additional percussion
Floriano Bocchino - piano
Stefano Cabrera - cello
Roberto Izzo - violin
Raffaele Rebaudengo - viola
L'Aura Portrais: Kris Knight
Cover Photos: Stefano Padovani
Art Direction and Graphic Design: Mogollon
Management: Andrea Bariselli

L'Aura albums
2007 albums